The Fiat 519 was a model of car produced by Italian automotive company, Fiat between 1922 and 1927. 

2411 were produced in total. Approximately 25 known worldwide of which one is a genuine 519S and three others are shortened 519s. Three have the pointed 519S radiator and the other two are flat.

Types
 519, 519A, 519B,519C &519S 4/5S Tourer 4 doors, 2+2 seats
519A had taller radiator and detail changes to engine.-Larger water pump, Rocker oil feed to centre pedestal and rear"anti-rolling leaf" omitted giving conventional rear suspension.
519B had entirely different front brake actuation (perrot)
519C (colonial) had increased Ground clearance. None are known, so may not have been produced although catalogued.
519S Shorter wheelbase and  track.

Specifications
Engine Type: Capacity Config Model Bore/Stroke CR
Engine size: 4766 cc  S6 OHV         85   140
Cylinder: 12 valves total 2 valves per cylinder
Power: (40 hp)
Wheelbase: 
Track front: 
Rear 
Length: 
Length:wheelbase ratio 1.32
Kerb weight

Construction
Bore × stroke  × 
Bore/Stroke ratio 0.61
Displacement 4766 cc (290.839 cu in)
Unitary capacity 794.33 cc/cylinder
Aspiration Normal
Compressor type N/A
Intercooler None
Max. output 78.1 PS (77.0 bhp) (57.4 kW)
rpm 2600 rpm
Specific output 16.2 bhp/litre 0.26 bhp/cu
Top speed 127 km/h (79 mph)
Power-to-weight 32.77 bhp/ton

519
Cars introduced in 1922